"Who Sold Her Out" is a song by Eskimo Joe, released in June 2001 as the second single from their debut album Girl. The single was released through Modular Recordings along with two b-sides; "Love List" and a demo version of "Take a Rest".

At the ARIA Music Awards of 2001, the song was nominated for ARIA Award for Breakthrough Artist – Single.

The single was re-release as a double-A sided single with "Liar" where is debuted at number 94 on the ARIA Charts.

Track listing

Charts

Release history

References

Eskimo Joe songs
2001 singles
Song recordings produced by Ed Buller
2000 songs
Modular Recordings singles
Songs written by Stuart MacLeod (musician)
Songs written by Joel Quartermain
Songs written by Kavyen Temperley